Desne is one of nine villages of the Municipality of Kula Norinska, in the Dubrovnik-Neretva County, on Croatia's Dalmatian coast.

Former speaker of the Croatian Parliament Luka Bebić and the well-known Croatian-American winemaker Mike Grgich were born in Desne.

Architecture

Parish church of Saint George 

The church was built at the end of or the beginning of the 18th century, after the Ottomans lost the village. It was too small to accommodate all the denizens, so the Makarska bishop Fabijan Blašković in 1779 ordered a chapel of the same size to be built. This didn't happen, and the church started deteriorating and became dangerous for entrants. In 1837, service was banned until it was fixed. It was repaired in 1845 and expanded to 16.5x8 metres. The belfry was built after World War I. A renovation happened in 1990 when Dušan Brečić was pastor. Afterwards, archbishop Ante Jurić, consecrated the church on the holiday of Saint Liborius, on 23 July 1991.

Chapel of Saint Nicholas 

The 6.7x5.3 metre chapel was built after the foundation of the parish in 1921, next to the parish house, in the part of the village called Kod Kuća. Since the populace from nearby hamlets left, mass is held only during the holiday of Saint Nicholas and by need.

Chapel of Saint Roch on Rujnica 
The earliest mention of this 9.15x4 metre chapel is in 1761 when a baptism was recorded. The pastor settled on the mountain Rujnica that year. The village in which the chapel has been was abandoned by 1910. Today, mass is held there only on the holiday of Saint Roch, the third day of Easter, and the third day of Pentecost. The descendants of the former populace then congregate. The chapel's roof was renovated which saved it from further deterioration.

Nearby chapels 
There are two small chapels, both dedicated to the Virgin Mary, near the village. The first is in the hamlet Medaca, and the second is in the hamlet Bebići.

Demographics

References

External links
www.desne.net
pictures of Desne

Populated places in Dubrovnik-Neretva County